Quchan Atiq Rural District is a rural district (dehestan) in the Central District of Quchan County, Razavi Khorasan province, Iran. At the 2006 census, its population was 24,559, in 6,137 families.  The rural district has 44 villages.

References 

Rural Districts of Razavi Khorasan Province
Quchan County